The Consortium of Universities for Global Health (CUGH), established in 2008, is a membership-based nonprofit organization focusing on global health. Its members are primarily institutions, although individuals can also become members. CUGH members currently include over 145 academic institutions and other organizations. CUGH was established in 2008 with funding from the Bill & Melinda Gates Foundation and The Rockefeller Foundation.

Annual conference

Since 2009, CUGH has held an annual conference for global health academics and practitioners. 
 The fourth annual conference, held March 14–16, 2013, in Washington, D.C., had over 1,400 attendees, representing 56 countries and 721 institutions. Speakers at the conference included Dr. Agnes Binagwaho, the Minister of Health of Rwanda, Ambassador Eric Goosby of PEPFAR, and USAID Administrator Dr. Rajiv Shah. 
 The fifth annual conference was held May 10–12, 2014, in Washington, D.C. The theme was "Universities 2.0: Advancing the Global Health Agenda in the Post-MDG Era."
 The seventh annual conference, April 8–11, 2016, in San Francisco, had over 1,800 attendees and the theme was "Bridging to a Sustainable Future in Global Health".
 The eighth annual conference was held April 7–9, 2017, in Washington, D.C., with the theme of "Healthy People, Healthy Ecosystems: Implementation, Leadership & Sustainability in Global Health".

Member List

References

External links
CUGH website
CUGH Twitter

Organizations established in 2008
Public health organizations
Health education organizations
Non-profit organizations based in Washington, D.C.
International organizations based in the United States
2008 establishments in Washington, D.C.